Jennifer Jo Kemp (born May 28, 1955) is an American former competition swimmer, Olympic champion, and former world record-holder. At the 1972 Olympics she won a gold medal in the 4×100-meter freestyle relay, setting a world record, and reached semifinals of the individual 100-meter freestyle event.

Kemp initially specialized in the backstroke before changing to freestyle in 1971. Next year she won the 100 m AAU title.

See also
 List of Olympic medalists in swimming (women)
 List of University of Cincinnati people
 World record progression 4 × 100 metres freestyle relay

References

1955 births
Living people
American female freestyle swimmers
Cincinnati Bearcats women's swimmers
World record setters in swimming
Olympic gold medalists for the United States in swimming
Swimmers from Cincinnati
Swimmers at the 1972 Summer Olympics
Swimmers at the 1975 Pan American Games
Medalists at the 1972 Summer Olympics
Pan American Games bronze medalists for the United States
Pan American Games medalists in swimming
Medalists at the 1975 Pan American Games